This is a list of Regions of Belarus by Human Development Index as of 2021.

References 

Belarus
Belarus
Human Development Index (HDI)